Evergreen School District No. 114 is a public school district in Clark County, Washington, and serves the city of Vancouver. As of 2022, the district has an enrollment of about 23,000 students. Evergreen Public Schools is one of the largest school districts in Washington .

Schools

High schools
High schools serve students in grade 9 through grade 12.

Middle schools
Middle schools serve students in grade 6 through grade 8.

Elementary schools
Elementary schools serve students in kindergarten through grade 5.

Alternative schools
Alternative schools serve a variety of students from pre-kindergarten through grade 12.

Envision Evergreen 
A $695 million bond measure was passed in February 2018. Combined with state matching funds and impact fees, more than $800 million of construction projects will be completed by 2024. Some of the oldest schools in the district will be rebuilt, while the remainder of the schools will have upgrades and improvements.

In addition to new construction, Evergreen Public Schools is committed to maintaining and improving existing facilities. About $76 million of the bond funds will go towards capital renewal projects.

2022 staffing changes 
On December 28, 2021 John Boyd was named the Interim Superintendent. Boyd came on board in January, 2022. The members of the school board are Victoria Bradford, Rob Perkins, Julie Bocanegra, Ginny Gronwoldt and Jacqueline Weatherspoon.  and Rachel Rogers.

References

External links
Evergreen School District No. 114
Evergreen School District Report Card

School districts in Washington (state)
Education in Clark County, Washington